The Government of Azad Kashmir is the state government which administers one of the territories of Pakistani-administered Kashmir territories of Azad Kashmir. The Azad Kashmir government consists of a president as head of state and a prime minister as chief executive, with the support of a council of ministers. The state assembly is the Azad Kashmir Legislative Assembly.

Executive 

The chief executive of the government is the prime minister, who is elected by the Azad Kashmir Legislative Assembly and is supported by a council of ministers.

Departments and services 

 Auqaf Department
 AJ&K Board of Revenue
 Services & General Administration
 Election Commission
 Electricity Department
 Food Department
 Forest Department
 Finance Department
 Tourism Department
 Industries & Commerce Department
 Information Department
 Information Technology Board
 Law Department
 Local Government
 Police Department
 Planning & Development
 State Disaster Management Authority
 Transport Authority
 Bank of Azad Jammu and Kashmir
 Health Department
 Agriculture Department
 Education Department

Legislature 

The Azad Kashmir Legislative Assembly, also known as the AJK Legislative Assembly, is a unicameral legislature of elected representatives. The assembly consists of 41 elected members and eight co-opted members of whom five are women, one is from the Ulama community, one is from Jammu and Kashmir technocrats and other professionals, and one is from Jammu and Kashmir nationals residing abroad.

Judiciary

Supreme Court 
The Supreme Court of Azad Jammu and Kashmir is the highest court of appeals in Azad Kashmir. It consists of a chief justice and two other judges. The number of judges in the supreme Court has been fixed at three by the Azad Kashmir Interim Constitution Act of 1974.

High Court 
The high court of Azad Kashmir, which serves as the court of appeals, has three circuit benches based in Kotli, Mirpur and Rawalakot.

See also
 Government of Gilgit-Baltistan
 Administrative System of the Federally Administered Tribal Areas
 President of Azad Kashmir
 Prime Minister of Azad Kashmir
 Azad Jammu and Kashmir Council
Chief Election Commissioner for conducting general elections in AJK;

Service Tribunal for adjudicating service issues of civil servants;

Zakat Council for collecting, distributing the zakat system in AJK;

Supreme Judicial Council of AJK;

References

External links
 Azad Jammu & Kashmir Government